Steven J. Rosenbaum is an American author, entrepreneur and filmmaker. He was a Resident at TED in New York City and holds two patents in the areas of video curation and advertising technology. Rosenbaum is the co-founder and executive director of the Sustainable Media Center.

He, along with his wife, is the largest donor of archival content to the National 9/11 Memorial & Museum and co-directed the film The Outsider. He was an executive director of the NYC Media Lab from 2020 to 2022.

Career
Rosenbaum founded Broadcast News Network (BNN). He also acted as the company's executive producer for the company's main program Broadcast New York. In 1991 the show was awarded a New York Regional Emmy for "Outstanding Magazine Format Programming", and "Outstanding Issues Programming - Segments". Later, Rosenbaum was nominated for a national Emmy Award for "Exceptional Merit in Nonfiction Filmmaking" for the film With All Deliberate Speed'

In 1995, he created MTV News: Unfiltered; a half-hour show on MTV featuring first-person stories provided by viewers and curated by the show's producers. The show would typically feature content not covered by traditional media and was the first commercial use of UGC, User-Generated Content.

In 2001, while working on a shoot for Animal Planet, he witnessed the 9/11 attacks on the World Trade Center. He directed his five film crews to Manhattan to capture the devastating aftermath of the attacks. This footage would later become the documentary "7 Days in September" (winner of CINE Golden Eagle and Telly Award) and go on to become a research archive of meticulously curated amateur video known as The CameraPlanet Archive The 500 Hours of 9/11 ) which Rosenbaum donated to the National 9/11 Memorial Museum.

Later in 2001, he launched CameraPlanet.com; a web-based video shop that created television content and encouraged users to create their own content by providing them with tips on how to tell their own story. The site featured many categories like “beaches” and “pets” and each video featured about four minutes of footage created entirely by the users.

In 2005, he was nominated for an Emmy Award for Exceptional Merit in Nonfiction Filmmaking for his work in "With All Deliberate Speed" for the Discovery Channel. The documentary, which was released to coincide with the 50th anniversary of the U.S. Supreme Court's Brown v. Board of Education ruling of 1954, examines via newsreel footage and interviews the events that led to the landmark decision.

In 2006, he founded Magnify.net, a New York-based startup focused on developing a video aggregation and curation platform. The company spent seven years building a steady business providing tools to enterprise clients who wished to manage and curate their own channels of video content.

In 2013 Magnify acquired Waywire, a video-sharing website founded by the former mayor of Newark, Cory Booker. In April 2014, Magnify.net adopted the Waywire name for its existing enterprise software business. One of the main objectives of the acquisition was to build a consumer-facing business around the curation of videos online.

In 2019, Rosenbaum joined the NYC Media Lab, a consortium of university partners focused on media innovation. He was promoted to executive firector in 2020. In 2022 he founded The Sustainable Media Center, which lists as its mission "We are a not-for-profit 501c3. Our mission is to investigate, experiment, and Innovate solutions to improve the Sustainability of our media ecosystem. The Center for Sustainable Media works to harness the collective resources of our community to define new standards of Media Sustainability and work to develop incentives that support media makers that embrace those standards.

Rosenbaum has also acted as a Member of the Social Media Week: New York advisory board, as a Member of the FASTPACK 200 and was also named the first-Ever Entrepreneur at Large for the New York City Economic Development Corporation, offering his expertise as an author and curator to help startup businesses in the New York Area grow and develop.

Rosenbaum is a frequent writer for websites including MediaPost, Forbes, The Huffington Post and The Columbia Journalism Review.

Patents
Rosenbaum has two patents in the areas of video curation and advertising technology. A year after YouTube was founded, Rosenbaum filed Patent No. 8,117,545 "Hosted video discovery and publishing platform" which was granted in 2012. And in 2014 Patent No. 208,812,956 "Video curation platform with pre-roll advertisements for discovered content"

Filmography

As a producer
 1995: MTV News: Unfiltered – TV series documentary; executive producer
 1996: Investigative Reports – TV series; executive producer; 3 episodes
 1997: 48 Hours – TV series documentary; executive producer; 1 episode
 2000: MSNBC Investigates – TV series documentary; executive producer; 1 episode
 2001: I-Witness – TV series documentary; executive producer; 2003
 2002: Facing Arthur – documentary short; executive producer
 2002: 7 Days in September – documentary; executive producer
 2002: Dog Days – TV Mini-Series documentary; executive producer
 2002: Strictly Personal – TV series; executive producer; 2002–2003
 2004: Staffers – TV series documentary; executive producer
 2004: With All Deliberate Speed – documentary; executive producer
 2006: God Grew Tired of Us – documentary; executive producer

As a director

 2002: Doctors' Diaries – TV series documentary
 2002: 7 Days in September – documentary
 2002: Dog Days – TV mini-series documentary
 2003: Journalists: Killed in the Line of Duty – TV movie documentary
 2004: Staffers – TV series documentary
 2021: The Outsider – documentary; director; executive producer

Publications
 Peer-to-Peer Video: The Economics, Policy, and Culture of Today's New Mass Medium  (Springer, 2008)
 Curation Nation (McGraw Hill, 2011)
 Curate This (2014)

References

External links
 nonprofit website
 Personal Website
 TEDBlog
 

1961 births
Living people
American film producers
Year of birth missing (living people)